White Side of Night is the third studio album by Irish band Scullion. It was released in 1983 by WEA and produced by Nicky Ryan with the band.

Track listing

Personnel

Scullion
Sonny Condell – vocals, acoustic and electric guitars, acoustic and electric piano, percussion
Greg Boland – vocals, Prophet and Roland guitars, synthesisers, percussion, additional arrangements
Philip King – vocals, harmonica

Production
Nicky Ryan – producer
Brian Masterson – engineering
Pearse Dunne – engineering assistant
Jack Breen – sleeve design

Release history

1983 albums
Scullion (group) albums